Crown Council may refer to:

 Crown Council of Belgium, the King, his Ministers and the Ministers of State, meeting on rare occasions to advise the King
 Crown Council of Ethiopia, the constitutional body advising the reigning Emperors of Ethiopia or its successor, the non-governmental organization of royalists that now operates as a cultural and charitable institution
 Crown Council of Greece, an informal advisory body to the King of Greece
 Crown Council of Monaco, a seven-member administrative body meeting at least twice annually to advise the Prince of Monaco
 Crown Council of Romania, the constitutional body advising the reigning Kings of Romania

Video Games
 Crown and Council video game